The 1953 World Sportscar Championship was the first FIA World Sportscar Championship. It was a seven race  international motor racing series for sports cars contested from 8 March to 23 November 1953. The championship was won by Ferrari.

Season

The 1953 World Sports Car Championship was contested over a seven race series. Now legendary and shockingly dangerous races such as the Mille Miglia and the Carrera Panamericana were part of an international race calendar, accompanied by the 24 Hours of Le Mans and 24 Hours of Spa, with the inaugural race being the 12 Hours of Sebring in the United States.

The Championship was for manufacturers, and works teams such as Scuderia Ferrari, Lancia, Aston Martin and Jaguar leading the way, but the majority of the fields were made up of amateur or gentlemen drivers, often up against professional racing drivers with experience in Formula One. Sometimes, even the Drivers World Champion joined in.

Entries were divided into classes based on engine displacement. Scuderia Ferrari were a dominant force in 1953, winning three of the seven races.

Season results

Results

Championship

Championship points were awarded for the first six places in each race in the order of 8-6-4-3-2-1. Manufacturers were only awarded points for their highest finishing car with no points awarded for positions filled by additional cars. Only the best 4 results out of the 7 races could be retained by each manufacturer. Points earned but not counted towards the championship totals are listed within brackets in the above table.

The cars
The following models contributed to the net championship point scores of their respective manufacturers.
 Ferrari 340 MM & Ferrari 375 MM
 Jaguar C-Type
 Aston Martin DB3 & Aston Martin DB3S
 Lancia D20 & Lancia D24
 Cunningham C-4R & Cunningham C-5R
 Alfa Romeo 6C 3000 CM
 Borgward Hansa 1500 RS
 DB Panhard HBR
 Porsche 550
 OSCA MT4
 Veritas Comet RS
 Talbot Lago T26 GS
 Maserati A6GCS
 Gordini T24S
 Frazer Nash Le Mans Mark II

References

External links
 1953 World Sports Car Championship race results at www.classicscars.com
 1953 World Sports Car Championship points table at www.classicscars.com

 
World Sportscar Championship seasons
Sports